Dehmalik is a village and jamoat in Tajikistan. It is located in Varzob District, one of the Districts of Republican Subordination. The jamoat has a total population of 8,034 (2015). Villages: Warmonik, Garob, Dehmalik, Zumand, Pichandar, Pishanbe, Porut, Poshum, Rogh, Safeddorak, Tagob.

References

Populated places in Districts of Republican Subordination
Jamoats of Tajikistan